The M-drop is a defensive scheme in the sport of water polo which is mainly used when the offensive team has a strong center or the center defender has lost position. The defense sets up in an M-shape, hence the name "M-Drop".

A typical scheme on offense resembles a "U" shape, with five offensive players in a half-circle around the goal, with one defensive player matching up with each of them. The sixth offensive player, known as the "center" or "set" plays in front of the goal. From left to right, and moving around the circle, the offensive players are named 1, 2, 3, 4, 5, and the set is 6. The defensive players are named D1, D2, D3, D4, D5, and D6, who guards the set.  Typically, centers play with their back to the goal.  Center defenders attempt to "front" the offensive player by working for position and placing their body between the center and the rest of the offense.  

If the offensive team has a very strong set player or the center defender has lost position, the player guarding at 3 will drop back and help the center defender in order to deter a possible pass in to the center. This play leaves the offensive player 3 open, so  defensive members D2 and D4 will “split” while swimming in between their player and offensive player 3. They also split in between the set and their player, hence the name M-drop, from the ‘M’ shape created.

See also
 Water polo

Water polo strategy
Water polo terminology